Janovice is a municipality and village in Frýdek-Místek District in the Moravian-Silesian Region of the Czech Republic. It has about 2,000 inhabitants.

Geography
The municipality is situated in the Moravian-Silesian Foothills on the Říčka stream.

History
The first written mention of Janovice is in a deed of Bolesław II, Duke of Cieszyn from 1450 as Janowicze. It was a part of the Frýdek estate within the Duchy of Teschen. In 1573 it was sold as one of 16 villages and the town of Friedeck and formed a state country split from the Duchy of Teschen.

After World War I and fall of Austria-Hungary it became a part of Czechoslovakia. In March 1939 it became a part of Protectorate of Bohemia and Moravia. After World War II it was restored to Czechoslovakia.

References

External links

 

Villages in Frýdek-Místek District
Cieszyn Silesia